Mathesius is a Czech surname. Notable people with the surname include:

 Bohumil Mathesius (1888–1952), Czech poet, translator, publicist and literary scientist
 Johannes Mathesius (1504–1565), German-Bohemian minister and Lutheran reformer
 Johannes Mathesius, the Younger (1544, Jáchymov – 1607), Bohemian-German physician
 Paul Mathesius (1548, Jáchymov – 1584), Bohemian-German Lutheran theologian
 Vilém Mathesius (1882–1945), Czech linguist

Mathesius is also a surname of a Finnish family and may refer to:

 Johan Mathesius (1709–1765), pastor and politician of the Caps party
 Per Niklas Mathesius (1711–1772), pastor and politician of the Caps party, brother of Johan Mathesius

References

German-language surnames
Latin-language surnames
Surnames of Czech origin